Thomas C. Duder (April 16, 1850 – 1912) was a merchant and political figure in Newfoundland. He represented Fogo in the Newfoundland and Labrador House of Assembly from 1893 to 1900.

He was born in St. John's and was educated at the Wesleyan Academy there. After leaving school, he worked as an accountant in the firm operated by his cousin Edwin Duder, Jr. and, in 1874, became head of the branch at Fogo. In 1875, he was named a justice of the peace for the northern district. In 1895, Duder went into business on his own. He served in the Executive Council as financial secretary, chairman of the Board of Works and Minister of Agriculture and Mines. Duder married Emily J. Haddon. He was named a magistrate at Bonne Bay in 1900, serving until his death in 1912.

References 

Members of the Newfoundland and Labrador House of Assembly
1850 births
1912 deaths
Newfoundland Colony judges
Dominion of Newfoundland judges